Afire is a 2023 German drama film directed by Christian Petzold, starring Thomas Schubert, Paula Beer, Langston Uibel and Enno Trebs. The relationship drama focuses on four people who are trapped in their holiday home on the Baltic Sea by uncontrolled forest fires.

It won the Silver Bear Grand Jury Prize at the 73rd Berlin International Film Festival, where it had its world premiere on 22 February 2023.  It is scheduled to release in cinemas on 20 April 2023.

Synopsis
In a holiday home on the Baltic Sea not far from Ahrenshoop in hot, dry summer four young persons meet. There is a forest fire and slowly and unnoticeably they are enclosed by the walls of flame. Trapped they get closer, and then the desire, love and sex overtakes them.

Cast
 Thomas Schubert as Leon
 Paula Beer as Nadja
 Langston Uibel as Felix
 Enno Trebs as David
 Matthias Brandt as Helmut
 Esther Ash as Ms. König, hotel manager
 Jennipher Antoni as Mrs. Roland, cashier 
 Jonas Dassler 
 Marieke Zwart as firefighter

Production
In October 2020, Christian Petzold revealed his next film, a gay love story. He revealed that he wants to make a series of films loosely inspired by the classical elements of water, earth, fire and air. Starting with Undine in 2020, a tale of water nymph, fire will rise for Afire.

The film was shot from 28 June 2022 to 17 August 2022 in Ahrenshoop.

Release

Afire had its  premiere on 22 February 2023 as part of the 73rd Berlin International Film Festival, in competition. It is scheduled to release in cinemas on 20 April 2023.

Reception

On the review aggregator Rotten Tomatoes website, the film has an approval rating of 92% based on 13 reviews, with an average rating of 7.8/10. On Metacritic, it has a weighted average score of 80 out of 100 based on 9 reviews, indicating "Generally Favorable Reviews".

Nicholas Bell in IonCinema.com graded the film 3.5/5 and wrote, "the real pleasure is in Petzold’s writing of his characters, and there’s an oddly satisfying authenticity to the discomforts and aggressions caused by Leon’s pretension-as-self-defense moments." Ben Croll reviewing for IndieWire graded the film B- and wrote, "Petzold tries to take the air out of a pompous windbag, and more often than not succeeds to delightful and caustic effect." Peter Bradshaw of The Guardian rated the film with 2 stars out of 5 and wrote, "The tonal change is not really convincing, and I wished that the movie’s potential for lighter comedy had been developed more. Even so, it’s a strong performance from Schubert.

Accolades

References

External links
 
 Afire at Berlinale
 Afire at Film portal 
 Afire at Crew United 
 

2023 films
2023 drama films
2020s German-language films
German drama films
Films directed by Christian Petzold
2023 LGBT-related films
German LGBT-related films
Silver Bear Grand Jury Prize winners